Oral and maxillofacial radiology, also known as dental and maxillofacial radiology, is the specialty of dentistry concerned with performance and interpretation of diagnostic imaging used for examining the craniofacial, dental and adjacent structures.

Oral and maxillofacial imaging includes cone beam computerized tomography, multislice computerized tomography, magnetic resonance imaging, positron emission tomography, ultrasound, panoramic radiography, cephalometric imaging, intra-oral imaging (e.g. bitewing, peri-apical and occlusal radiographs) in addition to special tests like sialographs. Other modalities, including optical coherence tomography are also under development for dental imaging.

Training

United States
Oral or dental maxillofacial radiology is one of nine dental specialties recognized by the American Dental Association.

To become an oral and maxillofacial radiologist one must first complete a dental degree and then apply for and complete a postgraduate course of training (usually between 2–4 years in length). Training includes all aspects of radiation physics, radiation biology, radiation safety, radiologic technique, the patho-physiology of disease and interpretation of diagnostic images.

The Commission on Dental Accreditation accredited programs are a minimum of two years in length. Several accredited programs in oral maxillofacial radiology require the resident to complete a master's degree, whereas others allow the option of pursuing a concurrent PhD or master's degree. Following successful completion of this training the Oral and Maxillofacial Radiologist becomes Board eligible to challenge the American Board of Oral and Maxillofacial Radiology examination. Successful completion of board certification results in Diplomat status in the American Board of Oral and Maxillofacial Radiology.

Australia
Australian programs are accredited by the Australian Dental Council and are 3 years in length, culminating in either a master's degree (MDS or MPhil) or a Doctor of Clinical Dentistry degree (DClinDent). Currently, the only Australian institution offering specialist training in oral maxillofacial radiology is the University of Queensland. Programs are focused on clinical radiology and offer comprehensive training with registrars reporting plain film, cone beam computerized tomography, multislice computerized tomography and magnetic resonance imaging of the maxillofacial region.

Fellowship can then be acquired through the Royal Australia New Zealand College of Radiologists and/or the Royal Australasian College of Dental Surgeons. Oral and maxillofacial radiologists in Australia tend to work in the private sector, reporting in medical radiology practices alongside medical radiologists.

Canada
Canadian programs are accredited by the Canadian Dental Association and are a minimum of two years in length and usually culminate with a Master of Science degree. Graduates are then eligible to sit for the Fellowship exams with the Royal College of Dentists of Canada.

United Kingdom
Programs in the United Kingdom are 4 years in length and culminate in a Certificate in Completion of Specialty Training and often a Master of Science degree.  Graduates are then eligible to sit for the Diploma of Dental Radiology from the Royal College of Radiologists.

References

External links 
 International Association of DentoMaxilloFacial Radiology
 European Academy of Dentomaxillofacial Radiology

Dentistry branches
Object visualization